Jan Brzoza, real name  Józef Worobiec or  Józef Wyrobiec (10 December 1900 – 17 November 1971) was a Polish writer, publicist, radio-host, Communist activist and one of the founders of the proletarian literature in Poland.

Biography 
Józef Worobiec was born in a Ukrainian working-class family (father Antoni and mother Katarzyna or Aniela). He was a carpenter by education.

He made his debut in 1932 with the novel Diaries of the unemployed (in Polish: Pamiętnikiem bezrobotnego), unexpectedly winning a special award established for unemployed youth by the Institute of Social Economy (IGS – Instytut Gospodarstwa Społecznego) at the peak of the economic crisis. This novel attracted the attention of Lviv writers and publishers, and for the future writer, it was the beginning of his literary career. Since then, he dedicated himself to a literary creativity. Since 1933, he was a member of the Lviv branch of the Polish Writers' Trade Union. Most of his works are devoted to peasant and working themes.

In 1936, he published the novel Children (Dzieci), describing the Lviv newspapers' environment. The other novel Building an edifice (Budowali gmach) about construction site workers and their strike was issued in 1938.

From 1921, Jan Brzoza was a member of the Communist Party of Western Ukraine. He participated in the Lviv Ant-Fascist Congress of Cultural Workers in 1936.

From 1939 to 1941, he was a member of the Ukrainian Writers' Union and later an activist of the Union of Polish Patriots.

In 1944–1945, Brzoza was the editor of the Lviv newspaper Czerwony Sztandar (Red Banner). After World War II he moved to Poland where lived in Silesia. Up to 1947, he was the cultural editor of the Katowice newspaper Trybuna Robotnicza (Workers' Tribune), then in 1947-1956 he led the Katowice branch of the Polish Writers' Union.

He was lected deputy of the Sejm of the Polish People's Republic in 1957–1961 years.

Jan Brzoza died in Myszków in 1971, buried in Katowice.

Recognition 
He was awarded the Polish Order of the Banner of Labour (II class).

Works 
 Diaries of the unemployed (Pamiętnik bezrobotnego), 1933
 Children (Dzieci), 1936
 Building an edifice (Budowali gmach), 1938
 Earth (Ziemia), 1948
 The Ninth Battalion (Dziewiąty battalion), 1953
 Lodzia tramwajarka, 1958
 The story "Beskyde Nights" (Beskidzkie noce), 1964
 My literary adventures (Moje przygody literackie), 1967
 Return from America (Powrót z Ameryki), 1966
 Good day has come (Przyszedł dobry dzień), 1971

Literature 
 Włodzimierz Maciąg, Literatura Polski Ludowej 1944–1964, Warszawa 1973, s. 471.
 Maciej Matwijów, Walka o lwowskie dobra kultury w latach 1945–1948, Wrocław 1996.
 Jacek Trznadel, Kolaboranci: Tadeusz Boy-Żeleński i grupa komunistycznych pisarzy we Lwowie 1939–1941, Komorów 1998, s. 231.
 „Rocznik Literacki” 1971, s. 625.
 Jerzy Kwiatkowski: Dwudziestolecie międzywojenne. Wyd. III – 5 dodruk. Warszawa: Wydawnictwo Naukowe PWN, 2012, s. 301–302, seria: Wielka Historia Literatury Polskiej. .

See also 
Katowice Forum

References 

Polish communists
20th-century Polish novelists
Writers from Lviv
People from the Kingdom of Galicia and Lodomeria
Polish Austro-Hungarians
Polish emigrants to the Soviet Union
20th-century Polish male writers
20th-century Polish politicians
Polish publicists
1900 births
1971 deaths
Communist Party of Western Ukraine members
20th-century Polish non-fiction writers
Polish male non-fiction writers
Politicians from Lviv